Balinka is a village in Fejér county, Hungary.

References 

Populated places in Fejér County